Within Australia, Attorney-General may refer to the following offices:

 The Attorney-General for Australia, the federal office
 The Attorneys-General of the states and territories of Australia:
 Attorney-General of the Australian Capital Territory
 Attorney-General of New South Wales
 Attorney-General of the Northern Territory
 Attorney-General of Queensland
 Attorney-General of South Australia
 Attorney-General of Tasmania
 Attorney-General of Victoria
 Attorney-General of Western Australia